Amado Samuel (born Amado Ruperto Samuel) is a former Major League Baseball shortstop, second baseman, and third baseman. Samuel signed with the Milwaukee Braves as a free agent in 1958. He would play at the Major League level with the team in 1962 and in 1963 before being purchased by the New York Mets that year. He would play at the Major League level with the Mets in 1964.

References

1938 births
Dominican Republic people of Cocolo descent
Dominican Republic expatriate baseball players in the United States
Living people
Major League Baseball second basemen
Major League Baseball shortstops
Major League Baseball third basemen
Major League Baseball players from the Dominican Republic
Milwaukee Braves players
New York Mets players
Sportspeople from San Pedro de Macorís